Group B of the 2011 Fed Cup Asia/Oceania Zone Group II was one of two pools in the Asia/Oceania zone of the 2011 Fed Cup. Four teams competed in a round robin competition, with the teams proceeding to their respective sections of the play-offs: the top team played for advancement to the 2012 Group I.

Hong Kong vs. Turkmenistan

Singapore vs. Oman

Hong Kong vs. Singapore

Turkmenistan vs. Oman

Hong Kong vs. Oman

Singapore vs. Turkmenistan

See also
Fed Cup structure

References

External links
 Fed Cup website

2011 Fed Cup Asia/Oceania Zone